Leptodactylus laticeps is a species of frog in the family Leptodactylidae.

It is found in Argentina, Bolivia, and Paraguay. Its natural habitats are subtropical or tropical dry forests, dry savanna, subtropical or tropical dry shrubland, subtropical or tropical moist shrubland, and intermittent freshwater marshes. It is becoming rare due to habitat loss.

References

laticeps
Amphibians described in 1918
Taxonomy articles created by Polbot